Nowland is a surname. Notable people with the surname include:

Adam Nowland (born 1981), British soccer player
Ben Nowland (born 1980), American football player
Mark Nowland (born 1962), United States Air Force general
Mary Josepha Nowland (1863–1935), New Zealand catholic nun and teacher
Raymond Clare Nowland (1894-1973), Australian architect